Lake Waramaug is a  lake occupying parts of the towns of Kent, Warren and Washington in Litchfield County, Connecticut, United States, approximately  north of Danbury. The lake is named after Chief Waramaug, who wintered in the area surrounding Lake Waramaug.

Description
Although natural in origin, the surface elevation of the lake has been raised by a small concrete and masonry dam. The lake is fed by Sucker Brook (Lake Waramaug Brook), numerous small streams, and groundwater that enters through the lake bottom. Drainage from Waramaug Lake flows southward into the East Aspetuck River.

The bottom materials on steep side slopes of the lake consist primarily of gravel, cobbles, and boulders, whereas the flatter areas consist primarily of sand, mud, and organic muck.  The watershed of the lake is 14.4 square miles. Approximately 74 percent of the watershed is forested. Wetlands and water bodies comprise approximately 10 percent of the watershed, while the remaining 16 percent of the area is low-density residential housing and commercial and agricultural land.

The shoreline development of Lake Waramaug is moderate and includes houses, seasonal cottages, and boat houses, with few commercial establishments.  Public access to the lake is available only within Lake Waramaug State Park, which is located at the northwestern end of the lake.  Outside park boundaries, the shoreline is privately owned . The park can be reached by taking Route 45 north from Route 202 and turning west onto North Shore Road.

An aquatic survey of Waramaug Lake was published in 1987.  The survey found aquatic vegetation to be relatively sparse, with only localized growths of emergent and submergent species along the shorelines and shallows of the lake. Aquatic species observed include Robbins pondweed (Potamogeton robbinsii), coontail (Ceratophyllum demersum), white-water lily (Nymphaea odorata), narrow-leaved arrowhead (Sagittaria graminea), yellow-pond lily (Nuphar variegatum), spike rush (Eleocharis sp.), bushy pondweed (Najas flexilis), leafy pondweed (Potamogeton foliosus) and pondweed (Potamogeton gramineus).

The fish species observed in Waramaug Lake  include largemouth, smallmouth and calico bass; lake and rainbow trout; yellow and white perch; pickerel, alewives, sunfish, and bullheads.

Town of Washington improvements
In 2004, the Town of Washington entered into an agreement with the Connecticut Department of Environmental Protection to reconstruct and expand the town's boat launch at Lake Waramaug, and to permit 20 launchings per day by non-residents in exchange for the DEP agreeing not to construct a new boat launch at Lake Waramaug State Park. The agreement limits motor boat traffic on the lake, and requires inspection of all boats for invasive aquatic plant species prior to launching. Plans for the new boat launch were developed in 2006, and the new facility was opened in 2008. In 2010, the Town of Washington separately completed major reconstruction of the adjacent, Hitherto Forlorn Town Beach at Lake Waramaug, which may be used only by Washington residents and their guests. New parking areas were constructed, new fencing and landscaping were installed, and a new boathouse with a caretaker's apartment was constructed.

In popular culture
"Lake Waramaug" is a song by goth/synth rock band Deadsy. It appeared on the band's 2002 album Commencement.

Further reading
Connecticut DEP, 1999, Connecticut Angler's Guide.
Connecticut DEP, 1999, Connecticut Boating Safety Enforcement Manual 1999 - Statutes and Regulations.
An Electrofishing Survey of Selected Connecticut Lakes. Jacobs, R.P. and O'Donnell, E.B., 1996,
State Board of Fisheries and Game, 1959, A Fishery Survey of the Lakes and Ponds of Connecticut.

References

External links

 Lake Waramaug Association
 Lake panoramics going counterclockwise around lake
 Lake panoramics of fall foliage including Lake Waramaug
 Cycling around lake video

Warren, Connecticut
Washington, Connecticut
State parks of Connecticut
Parks in Litchfield County, Connecticut
Connecticut placenames of Native American origin
Waramaug
Waramaug
Protected areas established in 1920
Campgrounds in Connecticut